Eduardo Aznar (28 February 1920 – 20 November 1981) was a Spanish sailor. He competed in the Star event at the 1948 Summer Olympics.

References

External links
 

1920 births
1981 deaths
Spanish male sailors (sport)
Olympic sailors of Spain
Sailors at the 1948 Summer Olympics – Star
Sportspeople from Getxo
Sailors (sport) from the Basque Country (autonomous community)
Sportspeople from Biscay